Pojangmacha (포장마차) is form of commercial establishment based out of a small tent (sometimes on wheels) or street stall found in South Korea. These establishment sell popular street foods, such as hotteok, gimbap, tteokbokki, sundae, dakkochi (Korean skewered chicken), odeng, mandu, and anju (dishes accompanied with drinking). In the evening, many of these establishments serve alcoholic beverages such as soju. Pojangmacha literally means "covered wagon" in Korean.

Pojangmacha is a popular place to have a snack or drink late into the night. The food sold in these places can usually be eaten quickly while standing or taken away. Some offer cheap chairs or benches for customers to sit, especially the ones serving late night customers who come to drink soju.

, there were approximately 3,100 in Seoul. This number has declined since city officials sought to shut them down, as they are considered by them to be eyesores, illegal and unsanitary.

Jongno is the most famous area for Pojangmacha but you can still find some decent food in Gwangjang and Namdaemun markets. Some pojangmacha in Jongno and other areas now offer set menus, with a combination of individual snacks put together in one plate.

Today, some places have even taken to calling themselves, indoor pojangmacha (실내포장마차), which have nothing to do with tents or carts. Indoor pojangmacha are essentially just bars that have decided to adopt the name to imply the inexpensive, casual atmosphere of the original version.

History
In one sense, pojangmacha are a recent phenomenon: They have existed in South Korea for less than 60 years. But in another sense, they carry on a long Korean tradition. For centuries, Korean peddlers provided goods, services and food by moving to where the customers were and not forcing their customers to come to them. Pojangmacha are merely the latest manifestation of this type of Korean service; fast food and drink that is provided somewhere close to customers’ workplaces and homes. Pojangmacha first began to spring up early in the 1950s in and around the Cheonggyecheon in Seoul. The first pojangmacha were quite different from their modern pojangmacha. They were small cars and carts, exposed to the elements, which sold small snacks and drinks. Later, some clever merchants began to cover their carts with an orange tarp, provide stools to sit on, and sell small appetizers. This eventually became the norm, with a tent containing a small cart and a handful of stools to sit on. As time went by pojangmacha began to get larger and to feature tables. In the 1970s pojangmacha flourished in Seoul as the Palli-palli (빨리-빨리: “hurry up”) culture of Korea kept Koreans at work late. As Seoulites streamed out of work, they stopped at a pojangmacha for a quick drink and a bite to eat. Today, the Pojangmacha menus have become increasingly diverse and the seating became even more comfortable. You can find many pojangmacha in the back streets of Seoul, Daegu, Daejeon, and Busan.

See also 
Street food in South Korea
List of markets in South Korea
Yatai (retail)
Food cart

References 
Montgomery, Charles. “Why Pojangmacha Street Food Is What You Need.” 10 Directory, 26 Oct. 2016, 10mag.com/why-pojangmacha-street-food-is-what-you-need/.*South Korean cuisine

Food retailers of South Korea
Street food
South Korean cuisine
Types of drinking establishment